

Belgium
Belgian Congo – Eugène Jungers, Governor-General of the Belgian Congo (1947–1951)

France
 French Somaliland – Paul Henri Siriex, Governor of French Somaliland (1946–1950)
 Guinea – Roland Pré, Governor of Guinea (1948–1951)

Portugal
 Angola – José Agapito de Silva Carvalho, High Commissioner of Angola (1948–1955)

United Kingdom
 Aden – Sir Reginald Stuart Champion, Governor of Aden (1945–1950)
 Malta Colony
Francis Douglas, Governor of Malta (1946–1949)
Gerald Creasy, Governor of Malta (1949–1954)
 Northern Rhodesia – Sir Gilbert McCall Rennie, Governor of Northern Rhodesia (1948–1954)

Colonial governors
Colonial governors
1949